I'll Go Crazy may refer to:
"I'll Go Crazy" (James Brown song) by James Brown & The Famous Flames
"I'll Go Crazy" (Andy Griggs song)
"I'll Go Crazy If I Don't Go Crazy Tonight", by U2